Dabaspete (officially, Somapura) is a village located in Nelamangala Taluka of Bengaluru Rural District in the Indian state of Karnataka.

Geography
It is part of Bengaluru Metropolitan Region. It is named after Major General Richard Stewart Dobbs of British Indian Army and the first collector of Tumakuru District. Dobbaspete is directly connected 51 km away from state capital Bengaluru along NH 48 South-Eastbound, 22 km away from taluka headquarters Nelamangala along NH 48 South-Eastbound, 19 km away from Tumakuru along NH 48 North-Westbound, 35 km away from Doddaballapura along NH 648 Eastbound, 38km away from Koratagere along SH 3 Northbound, 8 km away from popular Hindu pilgrimage site of Shivagange along NH 948A Southbound.

Economy
Due to it being part of Bengaluru Metropolitan Region and very close proximity to towns such as Tumakuru and well connected by a Golden quadrilateral NH 48, it has a KIADB Industrial Area housing many major industries related to mechanical, automobile, electrical engineering, etc.

References

Cities and towns in Tumkur district